Sophie Kratzer (20 April 1989 – 13 January 2020) was a German ice hockey forward.

International career
Sophie Kratzer grew up in Velden (Vils) and started her hockey career in the youth teams of local clubs ESC Dorfen and ESV Gebensbach. From 2003 to 2017 she played in the Premier Division (1. Bundesliga) for the ESC Planegg, and won seven German icehockey championships with the team.

Kratzer was selected for the Germany women's national ice hockey team in the 2014 Winter Olympics. She had two assists in five games.

Kratzer also played for Germany in the qualifying event for the 2014 Winter Olympics.

As of 2014, Kratzer had also appeared for Germany at three IIHF Women's World Championships. Her first appearance came in 2009.

Kratzer died of cancer aged 30 on 13 January 2020.

Career statistics

International career

References

External links

Sports-Reference Profile

1989 births
2020 deaths
Ice hockey players at the 2014 Winter Olympics
Olympic ice hockey players of Germany
Sportspeople from Landshut
German women's ice hockey forwards
Deaths from cancer in Germany